Kuzebekovo (Qujabaq) is a rural locality (a village) in Novochebenkinsky Selsoviet, Zianchurinsky District, Bashkortostan, Russia. The population was 157 as of 2010. There are 6 streets.

Geography 
Kuzebekovo is located 21 km west of Isyangulovo (the district's administrative centre) by road. Novye Chebenki is the nearest rural locality.

References 

Rural localities in Zianchurinsky District